Agueissa Diarra (born 30 July 1998) is a Malian international footballer who plays as a forward for the Mali women's national football team. She competed for Mali at the 2018 Africa Women Cup of Nations, playing in three matches.

References

External links

1998 births
Living people
Malian women's footballers
Women's association football forwards
Mali women's international footballers
Malian expatriate footballers
Expatriates in Western Sahara
21st-century Malian people